Kamlesh Kumar Singh is an Indian politician and an MLA elected from Hussainabad (Vidhan Sabha constituency) of Jharkhand state as a member of Nationalist Congress Party 2019.

References

External links
Kamlesh Kumar Singh website

Living people
21st-century Indian politicians
Lok Sabha members from Jharkhand
People from Palamu district
Nationalist Congress Party
Date of birth missing (living people)
Place of birth missing (living people)
Year of birth missing (living people)